The clarytone is a musical instrument of the family known as fipple flutes or internal duct flutes — whistle-like instruments which include the tin whistle and ocarina. It is about the size of a cupped hand. It sounds like a flute or ocarina (round flute) and has a single funneled hole. It has a note range of almost 4 octaves (4th to 8th octave).

External links
Clarytone home page: a one-page website devoted to the clarytone.

References

Internal fipple flutes